Vimba mirabilis, also known as the Menderes vimba or Menderes bream, is a freshwater fish species in the family Cyprinidae. It is endemic to Turkey, specifically around Büyük Menderes River. It is still abundant in reservoirs and therefore considered as of least concern for conservation measures.

References
 Vimba mirabilis FishBase (March 2015)

Vimba
Fish of Turkey
Endemic fauna of Turkey
Fish described in 1960